The Half-Naked Truth is a 1932 American pre-Code comedy film directed by Gregory La Cava. The plot involves Lee Tracy as a carnival pitchman who finagles his girlfriend, a fiery hoochie dancer played by Lupe Vélez, into a major Broadway revue under the auspices of an impresario portrayed by Frank Morgan. The film was released on December 16, 1932 by RKO Radio Pictures.

Plot
Fast-talking Jimmy Bates takes responsibility for publicity for a struggling carnival owned by Colonel Munday. His latest scheme to attract customers involves promising to reveal the identity of the father (allegedly one of the local town's residents) of his hot-tempered girlfriend, "hootch dancer" Teresita. However, when the local sheriff learns that it is all a con, Bates, his friend Achilles and Teresita flee to New York City.

Bates has always bragged about his close friendship with powerful theater impresario Merle Farrell. Bates promises to make Teresita a star, but it soon becomes clear that Farrell does not know him. Undaunted, Bates promotes Teresita as Princess Exotica, an escapee from a Turkish harem, with Achilles as a eunuch servant and a lion. Bates informs reporters that she is to star in Farrell's show. At first, Farrell is outraged, but after a sharp increase in ticket sales, he signs Teresita to a contract.

Farrell insists that Teresita perform a slow Middle Eastern-style dance, which bores the audience. Bates instructs her to sing a modern song, which is a hit. Teresita becomes a star, while Bates becomes Farrell's publicity manager.

With Bates away on a business trip, Teresita begins a romance with the married Farrell. When Bates learns of the affair, he quits Ferrell's employ and promises to make the first girl whom he sees into a sensation that will eclipse Teresita's stardom. The girl whom he selects is blond hotel maid Gladys, whom Achilles is trying to romance. Bates has Gladys pretend to be Eve, the leader of a group of nudists. Armed with a compromising photograph of Farrell and Teresita, Bates blackmails Farrell into signing Eve to his show. Meanwhile, the public has begun to tire of Teresita.

Achilles returns to the carnival life and purchases Colonel Munday's business. Bates later becomes dissatisfied with New York and visits Achilles, and he finds Teresita singing as one of the carnival's attractions.

Cast
 Lupe Vélez as Teresita
 Lee Tracy as Bates
 Eugene Pallette as Achilles
 Frank Morgan as Farrell
 Shirley Chambers as Gladys
 Franklin Pangborn as Hotel Clerk
 Robert McKenzie as Colonel
 Theresa Harris as Emily (uncredited)

References

External links
 
 
 
 

1932 films
1932 comedy films
American comedy films
Circus films
Films scored by Max Steiner
Films directed by Gregory La Cava
American black-and-white films
1930s English-language films
1930s American films